Hamburg was a three masted barque built in 1886 at Hantsport, Nova Scotia.  She was the largest three masted barque ever built in Canada .

Background
Hamburg was one of the last of over a hundred large sailing vessels built by the Churchill family of Hantsport, led by Ezra Churchill.  The barque was named after Hamburg, Germany, continuing a Churchill family tradition of naming ships after ports where they often sought cargoes.

Career
The barque's captain for almost her entire career was Andrew B. Coldwell. Hamburg worked mostly Atlantic trades but also made several long Pacific voyages, rounded Cape Horn many times and made one circumnavigation of the world in 1891.  She called at her namesake port of Hamburg, Germany in 1895. She was converted to a gypsum barge in 1908 and served 17 years carrying gypsum under tow from the Minas Basin to New York. Her working career ended in 1925 when she was beached at Summerville, Hants County, Nova Scotia, just across and downriver from the site of her launch at Hantsport. In 1936, her massive wooden hull was burned to the waterline, leaving her lower hull partially covered and preserved in river silt.

Legacy
Hamburg's surviving hull offers a rare surviving example of the structure of a wooden sailing ship from Canada's Golden Age of Sail. The vessel's history is presented at the nearby Avon River Shipbuilding Museum at Newport Landing and at the Churchill House Marine Memorial Room in Hantsport. A lower mast from Hamburg is preserved at the Age of Sail Heritage Centre in Port Greville, Nova Scotia while one of her massive iron bollards is on display at the Maritime Museum of the Atlantic in Halifax, Nova Scotia.

References

Hantsport Shipbuilding: 1849-1893, St. Clair Patterson, Hantsport: Tug Boat Publishing, 2008, p. 108.
Sailing Ships of the Maritime Charles Armour and Thomas Lackey (Toronto: McGraw-Hill Ryerson, 1975), p. 150

External links
 Ship Portrait, Art Gallery of Nova Scotia Talships of Atlantic Canada web site
 Parks Canada Ship Information Database Registry Information
 Hamurg Nova Scotia Museum Marine History Database.

Transport in Hants County, Nova Scotia
Maritime history of Canada
Tall ships of Canada
Individual sailing vessels
Ships built in Nova Scotia
Victorian-era merchant ships of Canada
Sailing ships of Canada
1886 ships